CGS Sobuj Bangla is the lead vessel of the Sobuj Bangla-class inshore patrol vessels of the Bangladesh Coast Guard. She is serving the Bangladesh Coast Guard since 2020.

Career
The ship was laid down on 21 April 2015. She was launched on 1 December 2016. She was handed over to the Bangladesh Coast Guard on 1 August 2018. She was commissioned to the Bangladesh Coast Guard on 15 November 2020.

Design
She can carry out operations in sea state four and can sustain up to sea state six.

Armament
The ship is armed with two Oerlikon KBA 25 mm guns and two 14.5 mm guns.

See also
 List of ships of the Bangladesh Coast Guard

References

2016 ships
Ships of the Bangladesh Coast Guard
Sobuj Bangla class IPV
Ships built at Dockyard and Engineering Works Limited